SMS Bussard ("His Majesty's Ship Bussard—Buzzard") was an unprotected cruiser of the Imperial German Navy, built in the 1880s. She was the lead ship of her class, which included five other vessels. The cruiser's keel was laid in 1888, and she was launched in January 1890 and commissioned in October of that year.

Bussard served abroad for the majority of her career, first in the East Asia Division in the mid-1890s, and in German East Africa for the first decade of the 20th century. She had a relatively peaceful career; her only major action came while stationed in Asia in 1894. There, she assisted in suppressing a local revolt in Samoa. In 1910, she returned to Germany, where she remained in service for only two more years; she was stricken in October 1912 and scrapped the following year in Hamburg.

Design

Through the 1870s and early 1880s, Germany built two types of cruising vessels: small, fast avisos suitable for service as fleet scouts and larger, long-ranged screw corvettes capable of patrolling the German colonial empire. A pair of new cruisers was authorized under the 1886–1887 fiscal year, intended for the latter purpose. General Leo von Caprivi, the Chief of the Imperial Admiralty, sought to modernize Germany's cruiser force. The first step in the program, the two s unprotected cruisers, provided the basis for the larger .

Her propulsion system consisted of two horizontal 3-cylinder triple-expansion steam engines that drove a pair of screw propellers. Steam was provided by four coal-fired cylindrical fire-tube boilers that were ducted into a single funnel. She had a crew of 9 officers and 152 enlisted men.

The ship was armed with a main battery of eight  K L/35 guns in single pedestal mounts, supplied with 800 rounds of ammunition in total. Two guns were placed side by side forward, two on each broadside in sponsons, and two side by side aft. The gun armament was rounded out by five  Hotchkiss revolver cannon for defense against torpedo boats. She was also equipped with two  torpedo tubes with five torpedoes, both of which were mounted on the deck.

Service history

Bussard was laid down at the Kaiserliche Werft (Imperial Shipyard) in Danzig under the contract name "C". She was launched on 23 January 1890; fitting-out work was completed quickly, and the new cruiser was ready for commissioning into the Imperial fleet on 7 October 1890. She thereafter served on overseas stations in the German Empire. Early in her career, Bussard served on the East Asia Station with the East Asia Division. In July 1893, she and her sister ship  assisted in the suppression of a local revolt led by Mata'afa Iosefo in Samoa. They were joined by the old British corvette , and the three vessels bombarded rebel positions on 7 July, forcing their surrender. Mata'afa was taken to Apia, the capital, while Bussard remained behind to ensure the demilitarization of his supporters.

In 1898, Bussard returned to Germany, arriving in the Elbe River in March. On the return voyage, she carried several tropical birds for the Berlin Zoological Garden. After her arrival, Bussard went into drydock at the Kaiserliche Werft in Danzig for reconstruction. The barque rig was cut down to a top-sail schooner rig. A new, larger conning tower structure was built. Work was completed by 1900, when Bussard returned to service. She was sent to China in response to the Boxer Uprising earlier that year. While en route to China on 6 August 1900, a boiler room exploded aboard Bussard, due to a blown out manhole gasket; the explosion killed three sailors and seriously wounded another three men. Her crew suffered no casualties during the campaign.

As of 1901, Bussard was assigned to the East Africa Station in German East Africa, along with the unprotected cruiser . The only other German warships in Africa at the time were the gunboats  and the elderly ; these two ships were stationed in German West Africa. Bussard remained on the East Africa station in 1904, and Schwalbe was replaced by her sister . During this period, Hans Paasche served as the ship's navigation officer; he held this position for two years.

By 1908, Sperber had been transferred to German West Africa, and another of Bussards sisters, Seeadler, took her place alongside Bussard. Bussard remained in Africa until 1910, when she returned to Germany for a second and final time. She remained in active service for only a brief time; she was stricken from the naval register on 25 October 1912 and was broken up for scrap the following year in Hamburg.

Notes

Footnotes

Citations

References

Further reading
 

Bussard-class cruisers
1890 ships